In Greek mythology, Oncius (Ancient Greek: Ὅγκιος Onkios) or Oncus (Ὅγκος Onkos) was a son of Apollo and a ruler over Onceium (Onkeion), a region of Arcadia adjacent to Thelpusa, as well as eponym of a city Oncae. He owned a herd of horses, in which Demeter tried to hide from Poseidon's advances, changing herself into a mare. Poseidon did mate with her in the shape of a stallion, which resulted in the birth of the fantastic horse Arion. Oncius kept Arion and later gave him away to Heracles as the latter was starting a military campaign against Elis.

Notes

References 

 Pausanias, Description of Greece with an English Translation by W.H.S. Jones, Litt.D., and H.A. Ormerod, M.A., in 4 Volumes. Cambridge, MA, Harvard University Press; London, William Heinemann Ltd. 1918. . Online version at the Perseus Digital Library
 Pausanias, Graeciae Descriptio. 3 vols. Leipzig, Teubner. 1903.  Greek text available at the Perseus Digital Library.
 Stephanus of Byzantium, Stephani Byzantii Ethnicorum quae supersunt, edited by August Meineike (1790-1870), published 1849. A few entries from this important ancient handbook of place names have been translated by Brady Kiesling. Online version at the Topos Text Project.

Children of Apollo
Demigods in classical mythology
Arcadian mythology